Myctophum orientale, the Oriental lanternfish, is a species of lanternfish. The Oriental Lanternfish is native to deep waters.

References

External links

Myctophidae
Taxa named by Charles Henry Gilbert
Fish described in 1913